Postbank or Post bank may refer to:

Postal savings systems
(alphabetical by country)
 Bulgarian Postbank, a Bulgarian retail bank
 Chunghwa Post, a Taiwanese postal service that provides savings account services
 Deutsche Postbank, a German retail bank
 Japan Post Bank, a Japanese bank headquartered in Tokyo
 Kenya Post Office Savings Bank, s Kenyan bank headquartered in Nairobi
 La Banque postale, a French bank created in 2006 as a subsidiary of La Poste, the national postal service
 Postal Savings Bank of China, a Chinese retail bank
 Post Bank (Russia), a Russian bank created in 2016 as a joint venture between the VTB Group and Russian Post
 Post Bank of Iran, a bank in Iran established in 2006. 
 Philippine Postal Savings Bank, a savings bank in the Philippines.
 Postbank (South Africa), a savings financial institution in South Africa; a division of the South African Post Office
 PostBank Uganda, a financial services provider owned 100% by the Government of Uganda
 Tanzania Postal Bank, a Tanzanian bank headquartered in Dar es Salaam

Other uses
 Postbank N.V., a former Dutch bank, now part of the ING Group
 TT Hellenic Postbank, Greece; 1900-2013
 New TT Hellenic Postbank, Greece; founded 2013
 PostBank, a former New Zealand bank, now part of ANZ bank
 Postbank Ireland Limited, a joint venture of An Post and Fortis
 Austrian Postal Savings Bank, a modernist building in Vienna

See also 
 Postal Bank (disambiguation)
 Postal savings system